David Nagle (born 6 July 1992), better known as Daithi De Nogla (or simply Nogla), is an Irish YouTuber known for making Let's Play videos. He has been described as one of Ireland's top YouTubers.

Early life and education 
Nogla was born in County Limerick, Ireland. As a child, he would play videogames on his brothers' gaming consoles, later getting his own Nintendo 64 at the age of 16. He studied early childhood care and education at the Institute of Technology, Tralee, before dropping out to work on his YouTube channel full-time. In 2014, during his time studying at Tralee, Nogla reached a million subscribers on his YouTube channel.

Internet career 
Nogla began his YouTube channel in 2012, making Let's Play videos of video games. He has been called one of Ireland's top or most successful YouTubers by The Times, The Irish Times, Irish Independent, and Irish Examiner. Previously he had the second most popular YouTube channel in Ireland. As of October 2021, he has the third most subscribed channel in Ireland. His content features himself playing games with a group of online friends and content creators, including YouTuber VanossGaming.

In 2020, Nogla headed one of ten official YouTube gaming squads composed of online content creators to compete in the game Call of Duty: Warzone. The tournament's prize of $100,000 was donated to the Call of Duty Endowment in honour of Military Appreciation Month. Nogla officially rebranded his channel from Daithi De Nogla to just Nogla on Christmas Day in 2021.

In 2022, Nogla cameoed on Alpha Betas, a show created by Chris Bruno and David Howard Lee, and stars his friends Vanoss, Wildcat, BasicallyIdoWrk, and Terroriser. He voiced a zombie boss named "Nogla Zombie" in the fictional game "Left 4 Head." The show also has cameos from CouRageJD, Jordan Fisher, DrLupo, and 2 other friends of Nogla, Moo Snuckel and Mr. Sark.

Personal life 
Nogla lives in a bungalow he bought in County Limerick. He frequently travels to Los Angeles to do business, and to meet his YouTube friends and fiancé, with whom he has a daughter who was born in 2019.

References 

1992 births
Living people
Irish YouTubers

People from County Limerick